Jacques Vivier (9 October 1930 – 28 September 2021) was a French professional road bicycle racer from 1951 to 1957.

Major results

1951
Circuit du Cantal
1952
Tour de France:
Winner stage 20
1954
Felletin
Tour de France:
Winner stage 7
1955
Lubersac

References

External links 

Official Tour de France results for Jacques Vivier

1930 births
2021 deaths
French male cyclists
French Tour de France stage winners
Sportspeople from Dordogne
Cyclists from Nouvelle-Aquitaine